Ikerasak() is a village in the Avannaata municipality in western Greenland. It had 233 inhabitants in 2020.

Geography 
Ikerasak is located approximately 45 km southeast from Uummannaq, at the southeastern end of Ikerasak Island in the  northwestern part of Ikerasak Fjord, where it widens into the inner part of Uummannaq Fjord.

Transport 
Air Greenland serves the village as part of government contract, with flights between Ikerasak Heliport and Uummannaq Heliport.

Population 
The population of Ikerasak has fluctuated over the last two decades, slightly decreasing in the last several years.

References 

Populated places in Greenland
Populated places of Arctic Greenland
Uummannaq Fjord